Frederick Eis (January 20, 1843 – May 5, 1926) was a German-born prelate of the Roman Catholic Church. He served as bishop of the Diocese of Sault Sainte Marie-Marquette in the Upper Peninsula of Michigan from 1899 to 1922.

Biography

Early life 
Frederick Eis was born in Arbach, then in the Rhine Province of the Kingdom of Prussia, part of the German Empire (present day Germany). He was the youngest of four children of William Eis and Catherine Dietrich. When Eis was age 12, his family emigrated to the United States in 1855.  They settled first in Calvary, Wisconsin, then Minnesota and finally in Rockland, Michigan. Eis was taught Latin and French by a missionary priest, Martin Fox.

In 1861, Eis began his studies for the priesthood at St. Francis Seminary in Milwaukee, Wisconsin. Due to the American Civil War,  Bishop Frederic Baraga sent Eis to study philosophy and theology instead at the College of Joliette in Joliette, Quebec. During his final years at Joliette, he taught English, mathematics and commerce.

Priesthood 
Eis was ordained a priest by Bishop Ignatius Mrak on October 30, 1870, for the Diocese of Sault Sainte Marie and Marquette. After his ordination, Eis served in the following parishes in Michigan:

 Rector of St. Peter Cathedral Parish in Marquette (1870 to 1873)
 Pastor of Sacred Heart Parish in Calumet, (1873 to 1874) 
 Pastor of St. Anne Parish in Hancock (1874 to 1880) 
 Pastor at St. Paul Parish in Negaunee (1880 to 1890).  While at St. Paul, he reduced the parish's debt and built a school.  He was forced to resign in 1890 due to health problems.

For the next five years, to improve his health, Eis spent his winters in California and Colorado, returning to Michigan in the summer. After his health improved, he was appointed pastor of St. Sebastian Parish in Bessemer, Michigan, in 1894, then moved in 1895 to Guardian Angels Parish in Crystal Falls, Michigan, to serve as pastor. During this period, Eis served as the inspector of the diocesan schools.  After the death of Bishop John Vertin, Eis served as diocesan administrator.

Bishop of Sault Sainte Marie  and Marquette 
On June 7, 1899, Eis was appointed the fourth bishop of the Diocese of Sault Sainte Marie and Marquette by Pope Leo XIII. He received consecration on August 20, 1899, from Archbishop Frederick Katzer at St. Peter Cathedral.

During Eis' 23-year tenure as bishop, he led the diocese through the nationalist controversies within the American Catholic community, and founded several charitable institutions and hospitals. He was known for being helpful to men wanting to enter seminary and women wanting to join religious orders.In 1900, Eis travelled to Rome, meeting with Leo XIII at the Vatican.

Retirement and legacy 
On July 8, 1922, Pope Pius XI accepted Eis' resignation as bishop of the Diocese of Sault Sainte Marie and Marquette and appointed him as titular bishop of Bita and an assistant at the pontifical throne.

Frederick Eis died in Marquette on May 5, 1926, at age 83. He is buried in the bishops' crypt at St. Peter Cathedral.

Notes

1843 births
1926 deaths
People from Vulkaneifel
German emigrants to the United States
20th-century Roman Catholic bishops in the United States
Roman Catholic bishops of Marquette
Burials at St. Peter Cathedral (Marquette, Michigan)
People from the Rhine Province
People from Marshfield, Fond du Lac County, Wisconsin
Catholics from Wisconsin